The KZKT-7428 Rusich tank transporter artillery tractor was developed as a successor to the MAZ-537 by KZKT. It can haul semi-trailers loads up to 70 t, both on and off-road. It entered service with the Soviet Army in 1990.

It is powered by the YaMZ-8401.10-14  V12 diesel engine, developing 650 hp, located behind the cab. Curb weight - 23.7 tonnes, GVW - 50.7 tonnes, GCVW - 93.7 tonnes. Maximum speed - . Range - .

See also 
 ZIL-135
 MAZ-7310

References

External links 

Military trucks of the Soviet Union
Tank transporters
Artillery tractors
Military vehicles introduced in the 1990s